Pedro Fernandes de Queirós (1563–1614) was a Portuguese navigator in the service of Spain. He is best known for his involvement with Spanish voyages of discovery in the Pacific Ocean, in particular the 1595–1596 voyage of Álvaro de Mendaña y Neira, and for leading a 1605–1606 expedition that crossed the Pacific in search of Terra Australis.

Early life
Queirós (or Quirós as he signed) was born in Évora, Portugal in 1563. As the Portuguese and Spanish monarchies had been unified under the king of Spain in 1580 (following the vacancy of the Portuguese throne, which lasted for sixty years, until 1640, when the Portuguese monarchy was restored), Queirós entered Spanish service as a young man and became an experienced seaman and navigator.

In April 1595 he joined Álvaro de Mendaña y Neira on his voyage to colonize the Solomon Islands, serving as chief pilot. After Mendaña's death in October 1595, Queirós is credited with taking command and saving the only remaining ship of the expedition, arriving in the Philippines in February 1596. Isabel Barreto, Mendaña's wife, accompanied the expedition and was accused of causing the crew's low morale by her selfishness and strict discipline.

The search for Terra Australis

Queirós spent eighteen months in the Philippines, but returned to Spain in 1598, via Mexico. Upon his return to Spain, he petitioned King Philip III to support another voyage into the Pacific, hoping to find a large southern continent to claim for Spain. A devout Catholic, Queirós also visited Rome in 1600, where he obtained the support of the Pope, Clement VIII, for further explorations. He greatly impressed the Spanish Ambassador in Rome, the Duke of Sesa, who described him as a “man of good judgement, experienced in his profession, hard working, quiet and disinterested.”  While in Rome Queirós also first wrote his Treatise on Navigation as a letter to the king, further reinforcing his reputation as a navigator, and invented two navigational tools.

In March 1603 Queirós was finally authorized to return to Peru to organize another expedition, with the intention of finding Terra Australis, the mythical "great south land," and claiming it for Spain and the Church. Queirós was shipwrecked in the West Indies, but made it to Peru by March 1605. Queirós's party of 160 men on three ships, San Pedro y San Pablo (150 tons),  San Pedro  (120 tons), and the tender (or launch) Los Tres Reyes left Callao on 21 December 1605.

In January 1606 the expedition came upon Henderson Island and Ducie Island, and then Rakahanga (Northern Cook Islands), and the Buen Viaje Islands (Butaritari and Makin) in the present-day island nation of Kiribati. It is also probable that his expedition sighted Tahiti and other islands in the Tuamotu archipelago. Queirós narrowly missed the Marquesas, as well as New Zealand, thanks to a change in his planned itinerary.

In May 1606 the expedition reached the islands later called the New Hebrides and now known as the independent nation of Vanuatu. Queirós landed on a large island which he took to be part of the southern continent, and named it Australia del Espíritu Santo. In his printed memorials, notably the Eighth (which was published in Italy, Holland, France, Germany and England), this was altered to Austrialia del Espíritu Santo (The Australian Land of the Holy Spirit), a pun on "Austria", to flatter King Philip III, who was of the House of Austria. The island is still called Espiritu Santo. Here he stated his intention to establish a colony, to be called Nova Jerusalem. He seems to have identified Australia/Austrialia del Espíritu Santo with the huge northward extension of the Austral continent joining it to New Guinea, as depicted in maps like those of Gerard de Jode and Petrus Plancius. For, as he said in his Tenth Memorial (page 5): “New Guinea is the top end of the Austral Land of which I treat".

Queirós' religious fervour found expression with the founding of a new Order of Chivalry, the Knights of the Holy Ghost. The Order's purpose was to protect the new colony.  However, within weeks the idea of a colony was abandoned due to the hostility of the Ni-Vanuatu and to disagreements among the crew.

After six weeks Queirós' ships put to sea to explore the coastline. On the night of 11 June 1606 Queirós in the San Pedro y San Pablo became separated from the other ships in bad weather and was unable (or so he later said) to return to safe anchorage at Espiritu Santo. In reality, the crew mutinied, with the unfavorable wind conditions just giving them an opportunity to do so. The captain on the San Pedro y San Pablo named Diego de Prado, aware of the crew's plans, had already transferred to Torres' ship, and so did the expedition's surgeon. Queirós' ship, with Queirós being held in his cabin, then sailed to Acapulco, Mexico, where she arrived in November 1606. In the account of Diego de Prado,  which is highly critical of Queirós, mutiny and poor leadership is given as the reason for Queirós's disappearance.

Two weeks later, his second-in-command, Luis Váez de Torres, after searching in vain for Queirós and assuming Queirós (or rather the crew of his ship) had decided to go their own way, left Espiritu Santo. Torres successfully reached Manila, the center of the Spanish East Indies in May 1607, after charting the southern coastline of New Guinea on the way and in doing so sailing through the strait that now bears his name, between Australia and New Guinea. Torres was unaware of his proximity to Australia's northern coast, just over the horizon from his route.

Later life
Pedro Fernandes de Quirós returned to Madrid in 1607. Regarded as a crank, he spent the next seven years in poverty, writing numerous accounts of his voyage and begging King Philip III for money for a new voyage, sending the king more than 65 letters over a seven-year period. He was finally despatched to Peru with letters of support, but the king had no real intention of funding another expedition, as the royal council feared that Spain could not afford new discoveries in the Pacific. Quirós died on the way, in Panama, in 1614. He had married Doña Ana Chacon de Miranda of Madrid in 1589; the couple had one son and one daughter.  His son Lucas de Quirós, who participated in the 1605 expedition, was knighted an Alférez Real and became a regarded cosmographer in Lima.

Accounts of Queirós's voyage
There are a number of documents describing the Queirós – Torres voyages still in existence. Most significant are
 Queirós' many subsequent Memorials to the King Philip III regarding the voyage,
 Torres' letter to the King of Spain from 12 July 1607,
  Diego de Prado's narrative and 4 charts of New Guinea,
 Juan Luis Arias de Loyola's memorial to King Philip IV  (written about 1630 and based on discussions between Queirós and Loyola).

1617 may be the date of the first English translation of one of Queirós’ memorials, as Terra Australis Incognita, or A New Southerne Discoverie.
A short account of Queirós’ voyage and discoveries was published in English by Samuel Purchas in 1625 in Haklvytvs posthumus, or, Pvrchas his Pilgrimes, vol. iv, p. 1422-1432. This account also appears to be based on a letter by Queirós to the King in 1610, the eighth on the matter.

Some time between 1762 and 1765, written accounts of the Queirós-Torres expedition were seen by British Admiralty Hydrographer Alexander Dalrymple. Dalrymple provided a sketch map which included the Queirós-Torres voyages to Joseph Banks who undoubtedly passed this information to James Cook.

Memorials
Queirós sent at least 50, possibly 65, memorials to the King between 1607 and 1614. Although most were written manuscripts, Queirós paid to have fourteen printed and presented to the King. Copies of thirteen of these memorials are known to have survived. Scholars have numbered these memorials in different ways according to the memorials available to them for study, and those publicly known at the time. 1617 may be the date of the first English translation of one of Queirós's memorials, as Terra Australis Incognita, or A New Southerne Discoverie.
A short account of Queirós's voyage and discoveries was published in English by Samuel Purchas in 1625 in Haklvytvs posthumus, or, Pvrchas his Pilgrimes, vol. iv, p. 1422-1432. This account also appears to be based on a letter by Queirós to the King in 1610, the eighth on the matter.

The table below gives a summary of the memorials, including the classification systems used by four different scholars: Celsus Kelly in 1965, Frances Mary Hellessey Dunn in 1961, Justo Zaragoza in 1876 and Phyllis Mander-Jones in 1930.

Theory that Queirós discovered Australia
In the 19th century some Australian Catholics claimed that Queirós had in fact discovered Australia, in advance of the Protestants Willem Janszoon, Abel Tasman and James Cook. The Catholic Archbishop of Sydney from 1884 to 1911, Patrick Francis Moran, asserted this to be a fact, and it was taught in Catholic schools for many years. He claimed that the real site of Queirós' New Jerusalem was near Gladstone in Queensland, supported by elements of Queirós' description of the land he had discovered, such as his assertion that "its length is as much as all Europe and Asia Minor as far as the Caspian and Persia, with all the islands of the Mediterranean and the ocean which encompasses, including the two islands of England and Ireland. That hidden part is the fourth corner of the world".

Queirós in modern literature

Building on this tradition, the Australian poet James McAuley (1917–76) wrote an epic called Captain Quiros (1964), in which he depicted Queirós as a martyr for the cause of Catholic Christian civilisation (although he did not repeat the claim that Queirós had discovered Australia). The heavily political overtones of the poem caused it to be coldly received at a time when much politics in Australia was still coloured by Catholic-Protestant sectarianism.

The Australian writer John Toohey published a novel, Quiros, in 2002.

The British writer Robert Graves describes the 1595 expedition in his historical novel, The Islands of Unwisdom, written in 1949. In its introduction he describes his sources.

Namesake

The Spanish Navy gunboat Quirós, commissioned in 1896, was named for Queirós, using the Spanish spelling of his surname.

References

Bibliography 
 
 
 Kelly, Celsus (1966), La Austrialia del Espíritu Santo: the journal of Fray Martin de Munilla, O.F.M., and other documents relating to the voyage of Pedro Fernández de Quirós to the South Sea (1605-1606) and the Franciscan Missionary Plan (1617-1627), Cambridge, published by the Hakluyt Society at Cambridge University Press, (Works issued by the Hakluyt Society, 2nd ser., no. 126–127).

External links
 
  
Diego de Prado y Tovar's account of the Quirós and Torres voyage, with English translation, at the State Library of New South Wales
Discovery of Australia by de Quirós in the Year 1606 by Patrick F. Cardinal Moran, Archbishop of Sydney
 Discoverer’s Website project
Hakluytus Posthumus - Purchas his Pilgrimes Vol 4 by Samuel Purchas, Page 1432
The First Discovery of Australia and New Guinea by George Collingridge, Chapter XI
 "Pedro Fernandez de Quiros' Voyage" pp. 95–144 in An Historical collection of the several voyages and discoveries in the South Pacific Ocean, Volume I by Alexander Dalrymple (1770).  Canadiana, Internet Archive.  Includes translations of accounts by Tourquemada (pp. 103–143) and Juan Luis Arias (pp. 143–144).  Followed by two of the memorials presented to Phillip II (145–174), and additions of Figueroa (175-204).  This volume also contains accounts of Mendaña's voyage on which Queirós sailed. 
 "A chart of the islands discovered in the South Sea to the year 1620, with the tracks of some of the principal discoverers." In A chronological history of the discoveries in the South Sea or Pacific Ocean, James Burney, 1803. The chart shows the paths of Mendaña, Queirós, and Le Maire, with the islands visited. 

1560s births
1614 deaths
Portuguese explorers
Portuguese explorers of the Pacific
Portuguese navigators
17th-century explorers
16th-century Portuguese people
17th-century Portuguese people
Spanish East Indies
People from Évora
Expatriates of Portugal in the Spanish Empire